1,2-Dinitrobenzene is an organic compound with the formula C6H4(NO2)2. It is one of three isomers of dinitrobenzene. The compound is a white or colorless solid that is soluble in organic solvents.  It is prepared from 2-nitroaniline by diazotization and treatment with sodium nitrite in the presence of a copper catalyst.

References 

Nitrobenzenes